Craig McElhatton is a former professional rugby league footballer who played in the 1990s. He played at representative level for Ireland, and at club level for Dudley Hill and Bradford Bulls.

International honours
Craig McElhatton won 4 caps (plus 1 as substitute) for Ireland in 1995–1997 while at Dudley Hill, and Bradford Bulls.

References

Living people
Bradford Bulls players
Bradford Dudley Hill players
English people of Irish descent
English rugby league players
Ireland national rugby league team players
Place of birth missing (living people)
Year of birth missing (living people)